The 19th European Athletics Championships were held in Gothenburg, Sweden, between 7 August and 13 August 2006. The competition arena was the Ullevi Stadium and the official motto "Catch the Spirit". Gothenburg also hosted the 1995 World Championships in Athletics, and Stockholm, Sweden's capital, hosted 1958 European Athletics Championships.

Men's results

Track
1998 | 2002 | 2006 | 2010 | 2012

Field
1998 | 2002 | 2006 | 2010 | 2012

Women's results

Track
1998 | 2002 | 2006 | 2010 | 2012

Field
1998 | 2002 | 2006 | 2010 | 2012

Medal table

Participants

Trivia 
 The official song of the contest is Heroes by Helena Paparizou - winner Eurovision Song Contest 2005 with song „My number one" in Kyiv, Ukraine. Song „Heroes" used in opening ceremony (performed by Helena Paparizou and in an instrumental form during an artistic and pyrotechnic show) and tv intro that event make by public broadcaster SVT. The intro of the event, prepared by the Swedish public broadcaster, presented ice cubes with the logo of the organizing broadcaster, the names of the participating countries and a map of Europe with a focus on the locations of the city of Gothenburg. The dice appeared on the background of athletic competitors and the background itself was gray. The following part presents the organizing city, its inhabitants and the arena of the European Athletics Championships in Gothenburg. At the end of the intro, the event logo was formed. The musical setting of the intro was a melody from the official anthem of the event, recorded as an instrumental.
 The BBC have chosen to use Carola Häggkvist's 2006 Eurovision Song Contest entry Invincible in instrumental form as the title music for their coverage. They have also used various pop songs including Lena Philipsson's "Lena Anthem" and Lev livet by Magnus Carlsson also in instrumental form.
 Merlene Ottey, at the age of 46 and representing Slovenia, is fifth in the 100 m semifinals, failing to qualify for the finals.

References

External links

 Official website of Gothenburg 2006
 EAA Official Website

 
European Championships
A
2006
International sports competitions in Gothenburg
International athletics competitions hosted by Sweden
2006 in European sport
August 2006 sports events in Europe
2000s in Gothenburg
Athletics in Gothenburg